The Winter's Tale is a special Christmas album and also the sixth EP of the South Korean boy group BTOB. They pre-released the single "You Can Cry" on December 3, 2014 and released the title track "The Winter's Tale" after. The title track is written by members Jung Il-hoon and Im Hyunsik.

The song "Drink!" was banned at MBC because it contained suggestive lyrics for excessive drinking.

Track list
※ Track in bold is the title track in the album.

References

External links

Cube Entertainment EPs
Christmas albums by South Korean artists
2014 EPs
BtoB (band) EPs
Korean-language EPs